Edmund F. Webb (January 30, 1835 – December 7, 1898) was an American politician from Maine. A Republican from Waterville, Maine, Webb served two terms in the Maine House of Representatives (1872, 1873). In his 2nd term, Webb was elected House Speaker. In 1874, he was elected to the Maine Senate. A year later in 1875, he was elected Senate President.

In 1896, Webb served as Mayor of Waterville.

References

1835 births
1898 deaths
Republican Party members of the Maine House of Representatives
Mayors of Waterville, Maine
Speakers of the Maine House of Representatives
Presidents of the Maine Senate
19th-century American politicians